Teenarama was a 1960s television dance show for African-American teenagers broadcast by WOOK in Washington, D.C.

External links
 http://www.dancepartytheteenaramastory.com/
 https://www.washingtonpost.com/wp-dyn/content/article/2006/04/26/AR2006042602465.html
 http://washingtontimes.com/entertainment/20060615-082708-7089r.htm

Dance television shows
Local music television shows in the United States
1963 American television series debuts
1970 American television series endings
Culture of Washington, D.C.
1963 establishments in Washington, D.C.